The 1996 Frankfurt Galaxy season was the fourth season for the franchise in the World League of American Football (WLAF). The team was led by head coach Ernie Stautner in his second year, and played its home games at Waldstadion in Frankfurt, Germany. They finished the regular season in second place with a record of six wins and four losses. In World Bowl '96, Frankfurt lost to the Scottish Claymores 32–27.

Offseason

World League draft

Personnel

Staff

Roster

Schedule

Standings

Game summaries

Week 1: at Rhein Fire

Week 2: vs London Monarchs

Week 3: at Barcelona Dragons

Week 4: vs Amsterdam Admirals

Week 5: vs Scottish Claymores

Week 6: at London Monarchs

Week 7: at Scottish Claymores

Week 8: vs Rhein Fire

Week 9: vs Barcelona Dragons

Week 10: at Amsterdam Admirals

Notes

References

Frankfurt Galaxy seasons